Rose Wilson is a fictional character appearing in American comic books published by DC Comics. She was created by writer Marv Wolfman and artist Art Nichols, first appearing in a 1992 issue of Deathstroke the Terminator #15. She is usually portrayed as a Teen Titans enemy and later a reluctant member, struggling to win the approval of her father, Deathstroke, being his illegitimate daughter. She is also typically depicted as an apprentice to her father and later Nightwing for a time. 

Rose Wilson would make several appearances in media such as Teen Titans Go!, DC Super Hero Girls, and a live adaptation debut in the second season of the DC Universe and HBO Max series Titans, played by Chelsea Zhang. A loose variation of the character (with a different name, Isabel Rochev, and Ravager alias) appears in the second season of Arrow, portrayed by Summer Glau.
Fictional characters from Chicago

Fictional character biography

Introduction
Slade Wilson (Deathstroke) meets a Cambodian brothel owner named Lillian Wilson (born: Lillian Worth) on a search-and-rescue mission a few years after his divorce from Adeline Kane. His mission is to help her escape from war-torn Cambodia under the Khmer Rouge regime. After an intermittent love affair with Wilson, Worth gives birth to a daughter whom she names Rose. Believing it to be in the child's best interest, Worth keeps Rose a secret from Wilson. Worth eventually settles down at a brothel in New York City, and, during a time when Deathstroke is injured and a fugitive from the law, Worth takes him in and nurses his wounds. Wintergreen (Deathstroke's butler) discovers 14-year-old Rose and suspects that she is Deathstroke's daughter.

When Ravager (Wade DeFarge – Deathstroke's half-brother) kills Deathstroke's friends and family, Ravager discovers Rose, captures her, and tells her that Deathstroke is her father. Wintergreen and Worth launch a rescue attempt, but Worth is presumed dead after she drives a Jeep off a cliff while trying to run over DeFarge. Wintergreen successfully rescues Rose and escapes.

Rose tries to reach out to her father, but he turns her away. He fears for her safety because he believes himself to be responsible for the deaths of two of his sons. Deathstroke leaves her in the care of the Teen Titans superhero team. During a training exercise, Rose is injured and taken to the hospital, and her precognitive powers emerge for the first time when she has a lengthy vision of Deathstroke's future. She awakens before she can test her powers further. She leaves the Titans shortly after and does not see them again until the Technis Imperative conflict, where she allies herself with the Titans to save fellow Titan Cyborg. During this incident, she vocally challenges the New God Big Barda, as the Titans and the Justice League had come to blows. Barda seems more amused than concerned over Rose and their potential fight is neutralized by other forces.

New Ravager
The Madison family in Chicago adopt Rose, but DeFarge kills her new family. The Ravager claims to have been offered $100,000 for her death by an anonymous source, but neither of them know that Deathstroke hired DeFarge in an attempt to bring Rose closer to him.

Deathstroke anonymously alerts the Titans that Rose's life is in danger, and they fight to defend her. All of the fighters are rendered unconscious by an explosion of halothane gas, and Rose awakens in Deathstroke's lair. He apologizes to Rose for abandoning her and says that she is the only family he has left. Deathstroke suggests that she become his apprentice, offering DeFarge as her first kill. Rose accepts and takes the name "Ravager" for herself. Deathstroke secretly injects Rose with the same serum that gave him his abilities, and it causes her to suffer from psychosis.

Deathstroke doubts Rose's readiness to work with him and plans to disown her after she hesitates and is unable to kill Deathstroke's son Jericho (when he possesses Beast Boy's body). To prove her loyalty, she gouges out an eye to match his missing eye.

After Rose suffers a defeat at the hands of Batgirl, Deathstroke places her under the tutelage of Nightwing after Slade is led to believe he has given up being a hero. Nightwing agrees to train Rose, while surreptitiously teaching her the values of heroism. Although Rose develops a crush on Nightwing as the training progresses, the attraction seemed entirely one-sided. To test Grayson's loyalty, Deathstroke replaces Rose's missing eye with one carved from Kryptonite and pits her and Nightwing against Superman. Rose attempts to kill Superman, but Nightwing uses Superman's concern for the safety of not only the civilian bystanders, but Rose herself as her final lesson on altruism. Nightwing agrees to stay away from Rose on the condition that Blüdhaven remained off-limits to the latest incarnation of The Society, of which Deathstroke is a charter member. Following the bombing of Blüdhaven on Deathstroke's orders in Infinite Crisis, Nightwing returns and informs Rose that the Kryptonite Deathstroke had implanted in her eye-socket is not just a danger to Kryptonians, but it is also carcinogenic and is indeed lethal to humans under extended periods of prolonged exposure. Enraged and heartbroken that her father would endanger her life so dismissively, and emboldened by Nightwing's tutelage, Rose breaks all ties with her father and runs away.

One year after the events depicted in the Infinite Crisis crossover, Rose once again joins the Teen Titans. She wears the same costume and wields two katana-style swords. With Deathstroke and his serum's influence gone, Rose appears more balanced than previously depicted. Robin admits Rose to the team as a favor to the team founder and ex-leader, her former mentor Nightwing.

Rose forms a friendship with Kid Devil, using his flame breath to light her cigarettes. When Kid Devil is injured during a mission, Rose defends him, and on multiple occasions threatens those she deemed a threat to him. She later admits to Kid Devil that she is afraid of being kicked out, should the old members return to the team.

Over the lost year, the Teen Titans came to the conclusion that they needed more members. After discovering that Raven believes there was a traitor on the team during the previous year, the team agrees to begin with her. The team travels the world in search of Raven apparently on the run from the traitor. They also meet several other former Titans, such as Red Star, Zatara, and Bombshell. During a meeting with Bombshell, Rose is accused of being the latest traitor, working for Deathstroke instead. She denies the accusation, supported by not only Kid Devil, but also Wonder Girl, who believes Rose would never go back to her father. Robin and Cyborg agree that Ravager would return to the Tower. Furious, Rose prepares to quit the team altogether until the team's caretakers Wendy and Marvin reveal to her that the traitor had stolen one particular object: the computer disk containing Jericho's essence.

Realizing why Raven is truly on the run, Ravager quickly returns to the Titans' aid, just as the traitor is revealed to be Bombshell. Ravager manages to save Raven, just as the empathic Titan uses the same spell which resurrected her to resurrect Rose's dead and previously insane half-brother Jericho. Upon the resurrection of her elder brother, Joseph and Rose begin fraternizing, unaware that Bombshell's betrayal was orchestrated by Deathstroke, and that their teammates have been subdued by his associates.

Later, Rose and Joseph fly to New York to have lunch with Nightwing, after which they go to the original Titans Island and discover that someone has built a demented version of the original tower there. Upon entering, they find that their father has kidnapped their teammates, all to gain control of them again. Rose and Joey then rescue Robin from Slade and Batgirl, during which Rose finally has her rematch with Cassandra Cain. Rose and Joey both attempt to stop their father, but they are defeated and left at his mercy until Nightwing, Donna Troy, Raven, Cyborg, Duela Dent, Beast Boy, and Bart Allen arrive.

Following the death of her former teammate Bart Allen, Rose attends his funeral in Countdown #43 along with the rest of the Teen Titans.

In Teen Titans #50, Rose is present for Bart's wake, although she slips off after a while, bored with the somber, reminiscent atmosphere, and invites Kid Devil to join her in skinny-dipping in the Titans' swimming pool.

In Teen Titans vol. 3 #51, the Titans Tomorrow—a possible future version of the current Titans team—arrive in the present to aid the Teen Titans against Starro-controlled villains. Ravager's future-self is absent from the group and it is revealed that she betrays the team (primarily Bart Allen and Kid Devil) at some point. Kid Devil, his adult version Red Devil, and Rose are then sent to battle against Rampage & Livewire. Red Devil tries to convince Eddie to let Rose die during the fight, so that she does not manage to betray them in the future. Initially, it appears that Eddie intends to do so, before betraying his older self to aid Rose. Later, the trio return to the Titans Lair (home of the original Teen Titans), where they meet with Blue Beetle. There, Red Devil attacks Blue Beetle, claiming that he too cannot be trusted.

Eddie, Rose, and Jaime find themselves surrounded by an army of Titans led by Lex Luthor before they all battle against an invading army of Starros. Thanks in large part to Blue Beetle's powers and Robin and Wonder Girl managing to supposedly alter Robin's future (and thus alter the future of the Titans as a whole), the army of Titans is apparently defeated.

In Teen Titans #57, Rose is attacked by Persuader, Copperhead, and Dreadbolt of the Terror Titans, who had managed to infiltrate Titans Tower. During the battle, they goad Rose about the fate of Kid Devil, whom they had earlier captured. Despite overwhelming numbers, they are unable to take down Rose. Rose ruptures a gas line with her energy swords, blowing up a section of the tower. Rose is revealed to have survived the explosion by crossing the swords, creating a forcefield. She then follows the Terror Titans back to their base, saving Wonder Girl from Disruptor and Persuader. She then battles Clock King, her own precognitive powers matching him. Clock King offers Rose a place on his team, but she refuses. Clock King then ejects the Titans from his base. Back at the tower, Rose overhears Robin and Wonder Girl talking about her almost killing Persuader during battle, and deciding there will be "repercussions". Rose decides to leave the Titans, using one of Clock King's teleportation devices to do it.

In Terror Titans #1, Ravager is seen talking with Clock King, negotiating her role within his group. She agrees to take part in one of The Dark Side Club's arena battles, fighting against Fever. Rose defeats Fever, but when ordered to finish her, refuses, prompting Clock King to have Fever shot in the head. Although appalled by Fever's death, Rose stays, hoping to find out what Clock King's plan is. Continuing to fight in the tournament, Rose faces off against Static, and is almost killed. Rose eventually discovers that Clock King intends to use the mind-controlled teen heroes as his own "Martyr Militia" to destroy Los Angeles, entirely for his own amusement. Attempting to get help, Rose is attacked by the Terror Titans, who overwhelm her. Help comes in the form of Miss Martian, who had been posing as one of the brainwashed teens, and had managed to use her telepathy to free them. Ravager follows the retreating villains back to their base, where she confronts Clock King. Despite their equal precognitive abilities, Ravager is able to defeat him, although she was unable to prevent his escape.

Ravager returns during the Teen Titans/Titans/Vigilante crossover "Deathtrap", seeking to save Jericho, who had been targeted by Vigilante. However, the unbalanced Jericho refuses her offer of help, continuing in his plot to kill the Titans, forcing Rose to team up with the heroes to stop him. It is also apparent that she has become addicted to the adrenaline given to her by the Clock King.

Following the "Deathtrap" storyline, Rose briefly tries her hand at being a part of the Titans, but finds that she does not belong with them. After an altercation with Bombshell, staged to ensure her loyalty to the team, Rose leaves to find her own way in life. From Teen Titans #72 onwards, Ravager is featured in a 10-page, 9 part co-feature, Ravager: Fresh Hell, written by Sean McKeever and drawn by Yildiray Cinar.

In the Teen Titans tie-in to the Blackest Night crossover, Rose tracks Deathstroke down to his old mentor Wintergreen's house and attacks him. During the fight, the two are attacked by their deceased relatives Grant, Wade and Adeline, who, along with Wintergreen, have all been reanimated as Black Lanterns. When Grant attacks Deathstroke, intending to burn him in a fireplace, Rose reluctantly intervenes, saving her hated father. She then attempts to incinerate Wade, but is surprised when Jericho jumps out of his body. Jericho, whose eyes had grown back since Vigilante's attack, uses his powers to make the Black Lanterns destroy themselves. After the battle, Rose refuses to reconcile with Deathstroke, despite acknowledging her daughterly love for him. She also realises that her mother may still be alive, as she was not among the attacking Black Lanterns.

Following an adventure in another dimension, Static, Miss Martian, Bombshell, and Aquagirl leave the Titans, and Rose is invited to rejoin the team to help build it back up. While staying in the Tower, Rose hacks into the team computer and begins searching for information on her mother. During her time with the group, Rose begins flirting with Superboy, and befriends Damian Wayne, the new Robin. She remains with the team up until the final battle with Superboy-Prime and the Legion of Doom, where she teams with Speedy to take down Persuader, one of her former teammates on the Terror Titans. She and Damian also help turn the tide of the battle by using a piece of Kryptonite to destroy several evil clones of Superboy.

The New 52
Following the events of "Flashpoint", the DC Universe was relaunched. In the New 52, Rose now has both eyes intact and does not go by the name Ravager, though she still appears to have her martial arts training and trademark swords. She is a teenaged mercenary hired by the shadowy organization N.O.W.H.E.R.E. to act as a handler for Superboy after he destroyed the N.O.W.H.E.R.E. lab used to create him in self-defense. Rose has a rivalry with Caitlin Fairchild, a young N.O.W.H.E.R.E. researcher who cares for Superboy. Her origin is altered so that she is now the daughter of Slade Wilson and his wife Adeline Kane, removing her Asian heritage in the process.

After last seen by the side of her father Deathstroke, following the events that happened in The Ravagers, she reappears 20 years in the future. In this timeline she is along her husband Garfield Logan, now labeled as Beast Man, living together in the Justice League Watchtower as Beast Man is the only Justice Leaguer alive. The two also have a daughter named Red who is being mentored by them along other superpowered teenagers in order for them to become a team. After an encounter with three members of the Teen Titans from the present Red Robin, Wonder Girl and Superboy, Rose and Gar put in action a plan to swap Superboy with the man of whom he is a clone (Jon Lane Kent, son of Superman and Lois Lane), who is responsible for the tragedy that happened in that future, to prevent those events from happening again. The plan is a success as Raven's soul-self departs with the Titans from the present and the unconscious Jon Lane, not Conner. Once alone, Rose asks Gar if they really did the right thing, which Gar responds: "I damn well hope so Rose. I damn well hope so".

DC Rebirth
Rose later reappears after the DC Rebirth relaunch, with her original Cambodian origin and mixed-race heritage now restored and both eyes intact. She is seen working as a strip club bouncer who moonlights as a teenage mercenary, and reunites with her father after someone puts a hit on her. Her past in the New 52 continuity also appears to be retconned, as she makes no mention of N.O.W.H.E.R.E., and claims to have been trained by Nightwing, much to Slade's annoyance.

As a young adult, Rose worked as a bouncer and precognitive mercenary, accepting contracts to prevent other hitmen from carrying out theirs, the latter job in particular earning Slade's disdain. When Slade learned of an assassination notice put out on her, he reappeared in her life under the guise of wanting to help her track down the one responsible. Following an encounter with Batman, it was revealed that Deathstroke himself put the hit out on her as a means to bond with her. Disillusioned with her already troubled relationship with her father, Rose instead decided to bond with her mother's family, seeking them out in Northern Vietnam, where she learned of the name her mother had given her, Xia before finding her mother's family in Minneapolis.  Despite being happy with her new family, hacker Hosun Park sought her out for protection from her father, proposing to her under the impression that Deathstroke would not harm his daughter's husband. Rose refused but, after learning that her new family was in actuality hired by Slade, accepted Hosun's proposal to spite her father, before she returned to Los Angeles for Joey's wedding to Etienne. During the ceremony, when confronted on his manipulation, Slade claimed he hired Rose's fake family so she could learn about her Hmong heritage. Soon after, an enraged Jericho attacked his father for supposedly killing Etienne, Rose being injured when she attempted to restrain her brother, leaving her with a fractured skull.

Powers and abilities

Original powers
Inheriting abilities from her progenitor and having them enhanced via mainlining of the super soldier serum that gave Deathstroke his powers. Rose Wilson possesses increased reflexes, stamina, agility, speed, strength and heightened mental acuity. But was also prone to psychotic episodes, such as when she gouged out her own eye to be more like her father while under its effects. She has received some training from Nightwing, including the virtues of being a hero. She also possesses a precognitive sense that lets her see into the immediate future. This allows her to react to oncoming attacks against her and to counter them accordingly.

She currently wields twin energy katanas that can cut through anything except flesh, and briefly merge into an energy shield. She also carries with her a small stash of adrenaline, both because Clock King had briefly managed to make her addicted to the substance, and also because while high on adrenaline her precognitive sense evolves into the ability to glimpse scenes from her immediate future. However, the more she uses adrenaline to enhance her powers, the more her metabolism is unbalanced, straining her health.

The New 52 and DC Rebirth powers
In The New 52 rebooted DC's continuity, the source of Rose's powers are metagenes. She can dampen another person's powers and abilities such as weakening invulnerability and do damage to people such as Superboy or Mister Majestic.
She also has anti-psionic powers, that make her immune to Jericho's possession abilities and Superboy's telekinesis. These facilities also psychically link her to other Gen-Actives, enabling multi-way mental communication with people enhanced by the Gen Factor. The limits of these powers are still unknown. 

In Rebirth publishing, Ravager reacquires her old superhuman skill set prior to Flashpoint. The only difference being she now derives her abilities from the hereditary metagene begotten from her father, which became active due to prolonged exposure to Mr. Wilson's sword: The Deathstroke.
Retaining the enhanced conditional practices of superhuman strength, durability, agility, healing, etc. She also had been bestowed a unique variation of the enhanced mind her father possessed; beyond the simple augmented brain percentage giving Deathstroke his genius intellect, Rose has an accelerated probability factor wherein she can predict the future via cataloging and assembling details in a highly accurate outcome assessment.

Other versions

Teen Titans (TV series)
While Rose never appeared in the Teen Titans animated series, she appeared as the antagonist in issue #49 of the tie-in comic, Teen Titans Go!. As Ravager, she returns to Jump City hoping to claim "what is rightfully hers". Ravager finds and attacks Wintergreen and Professor Chang, both of whom had something that belonged to her father. After blowing up Chang's robot factory, she goes on a rampage in Jump City, determined to carry on her father's legacy by defeating the Teen Titans once and for all. After a duel with Robin, the Titans help her understand that she does not have to carry on her father's legacy and offer her a home and a family while convincing her that she is free to make her own decisions in life. Touched by the Titans' words of friendship, she decides to frequently train (but not officially join) with them until she is ready to face her future as a better person.

Titans Tomorrow
In the "Titans Tomorrow" storyline, the Teen Titans are thrown back in time after teaming up with the Legion of Super-Heroes, only to arrive ten years into their own future. They discover that as adults, they are evil authoritarian dictators. However, a Titans East team has been formed to stop them. Rose Wilson is a member of the Titans East and is in love with Bart Allen, then the Flash, who is spying on the evil Titans. Rose and the Flash help the Teen Titans to return home.

The concept is revisited in Teen Titans vol. 3, where it revealed that the future has changed somewhat. Future Bart Allen is now just as unscrupulous as his teammates, and Rose's counterpart is dead. There exists no Titans East/Titans West division, as all belong to a greatly expanded teammates Titans Army.

Tiny Titans
Rose appears in Tiny Titans, although she does not go by Ravager. She wears an eye patch on her right eye and had an undamaged eye underneath. It is not mentioned whether the patch was worn to improve her sight.

Flashpoint
In the alternate timeline of the Flashpoint event, Rose Wilson was kidnapped by persons unknown, where her father Deathstroke, a pirate, is searching for her. Deathstroke and his shipmate Jenny Blitz located Rose, who was being held captive on the Caretaker's fleet. Deathstroke formulated a plan, while he and Jenny battled Caretaker's crew and manages to save Rose. After battling Caretaker's fleet, Rose rescued Deathstroke and Jenny from drowning, and is then reunited with her father and sailing towards an unknown destination.

Smallville comics
Rose Wilson appears as Ravager in Smallville season 11, based on the show by Bryan Q. Miller. She attempts to continue her father's work (Slade in this continuity having been a general with an obsession with stopping superpowered vigilantes, until he was left catatonic after Clark put him into the Phantom Zone), by taking out 'the next generation' of superheroes. Her Ravager gear seems to be heavily modeled after what Deathstroke wore in the second season of Arrow.

DC Bombshells
Ravager appears in the DC Bombshells continuity as a member of the Coven along with Barbara Gordon and the Enchantress. This version is a prophetic pirate and uses her abilities to predict the moves of her opponents and to warn her comrades not to stray from the Belle Reeve Manor. While Killer Croc is specific on why Batgirl and Enchantress are at the bayou Manor, he just claims that Ravager "did something bad". After Francine Charles proves Ravager's prophecy on never leaving Belle Reeve to be false, the Coven, Charles, and Killer Croc, form Amanda Waller's Suicide Squad.

In other media

Television

Live action
 Summer Glau portrays Isabel Rochev during season 2 of The CW's Arrow. She dons the moniker of Ravager and is trained by Slade Wilson / Deathstroke to get vengeance on the Queen family before the events of the show. In the second-season episode, "The Man Under the Hood", Rochev is mortally wounded by John Diggle in an altercation to save Roy Harper from Deathstroke. Later, she is saved by a blood transfusion from Deathstroke, thanks to the Mirakuru serum in his veins. In "City of Blood", Rochev is seen, as Ravager, attempting to exact revenge on Diggle, now with the same powers as Deathstroke. Afterwards, in "Streets of Fire", Felicity Smoak arrives and plows into an unsuspecting Ravager with her vehicle, allowing for Diggle's getaway. Seemingly unfazed, Ravager is next seen assassinating city employees by order of Deathstroke, the last of which is Star City's mayor Sebastian Blood, who betrayed them. In the season two finale "Unthinkable", Ravager is among those captured by Oliver Queen, Sara Lance, Roy Harper, Nyssa al Ghul and a group of ninjas from the League of Assassins. She later proves uncooperative and boasts about Deathstroke killing Oliver's mother Moira, so Nyssa snaps her neck, killing her.
The tie-in novel called Arrow: Vengeance details her backstory: Isabel is a daughter of Viktor Rochev and unnamed woman who was raised in Moscow, Russia. As a nine years old girl, her parents were murdered by Solntsevskaya Bratva. She was then adopted by an American couple and moved to USA. Growing up, she had trouble making friends in school due to her accent, which took years to overcome it. Isabel eventually went to business school, which lead to her interning at Queen Consolidated. She met the CEO Robert Queen and they began an affair, while Robert's wife Moira also began an affair with Malcolm Merlyn. Isabel was aware that Thea Queen is not Robert's daughter. They even planned to run away together, but Isabel's internship was cancelled and Robert never spoke to her again, leaving her bitter and desiring revenge. After her education, she became vice-president of acquisitions at Stellmoor International. During her time at this company, she consistently bought up Queen Consolidated holdings in an attempt to damage the company. Isabel then became associated with Slade Wilson and went to rigorous training to become a killer in combat. When Oliver left Starling City after failing to stop Malcolm Merlyn's "Undertaking", Slade planted Isabel in his company to take it over to draw Oliver back.

 Chelsea Zhang portrays Rose Wilson in season 2 of Titans. Rose takes the Ravager name and has meta human healing abilities along with incredible fighting skills. She is also the love interest to Jason Todd for a part of the season (as of the New 52 run of Red Hood and the Outlaws, it is confirmed that Rose and Jason Todd had a one time fling). When first seeing Rose on the news, Jason smiles and calls her a badass. Born from her father's extramarital affair, she grew up unaware of his identity, but recognized that he played a role in her superhuman abilities. After seeking him out, Rose was recruited by Deathstroke to act as his mole against the Titans at the cost of her left eye. Rose successfully infiltrates the team by claiming she wants her father dead to avenge her half-brother Jericho's demise. She also succeeds in creating tension among the Titans, which leads to them disbanding after Dick Grayson is forced to admit the true circumstances of how Jericho died. However, Rose's mission becomes compromised when she develops romantic feelings for Jason Todd, who leaves her when she confesses her true role to him. This prompts Rose to turn against Deathstroke, impaling him while Jericho escapes from their father's body into hers. Afterwards, she joins the new Titans team.

Animation
 Rose Wilson appears in Teen Titans Go!, voiced by Pamela Adlon. This version is a recurring enemy of the Titans, but also friends with Raven, Starfire, Jinx, and Terra.
 Rose Wilson appears in the DC Super Hero Girls episode "#DinnerForFive", voiced by Chelsea Kane. She does not yet use the Ravager alias, and is friendly and kind to Barbara Gordon. She is also shown to be more moral than other adaptations, as she stops her father from attempting to assassinate Babs and makes him apologize.

Film

 Rose Wilson makes her animated debut in Justice League: Crisis on Two Earths, voiced by Freddi Rogers. In the movie, she has red hair instead of white. She is the daughter of Slade Wilson, the President of the United States on the parallel earth of the Crime Syndicate and uses her notoriety to publicly denounce the Syndicate and her father's policy of appeasement (it is heavily implied that Ultraman personally killed Rose's mother). Later on, J'onn J'onzz saves her from an assassination attempt by Archer and volunteers to be her personal bodyguard. The two quickly fall in love. Once the Syndicate is defeated, they part ways. When Wonder Woman suggests he seek out Rose's mainstream counterpart, J'onn mournfully speculates "With my luck, she'll be evil".
 Rose appears in Deathstroke: Knights & Dragons: The Movie, voiced by Faye Mata. She is revealed to be H.I.V.E.'s new leader, the H.I.V.E. Queen, following the supposed death of its former leader, Jackal. At first, Rose's father Slade was unaware he had a daughter until Slade's son Joseph tells him. Later in the film, Jackal is revealed to be alive but turns against Rose and Joseph after having discovered their plot against him. Jackal is later defeated by Slade when the latter sacrifices himself, killing them both.

Video games
 Rose Wilson as Ravager appears in DC Universe Online.
 Rose Wilson as Ravager appears as a non-playable helper card in the mobile version of Injustice: Gods Among Us.
 The Teen Titans Go! incarnation of Rose Wilson appears as a non-playable character in Lego Dimensions, with Pamela Adlon reprising the role. She appears in a sidequest where the player helps her escape from the Jump City Juvenile Detention Facility.
 Rose Wilson as Ravager appears as a playable character in Lego DC Super-Villains.
 Rose Wilson as Ravager appears as a playable character in DC Legends.

Web series
 Ravager makes cameo appearances in DC Super Hero Girls.

References

Characters created by Marv Wolfman
Comics characters introduced in 1992
DC Comics characters who can move at superhuman speeds
DC Comics characters who have mental powers
DC Comics characters with accelerated healing
DC Comics characters with superhuman strength
DC Comics female superheroes
DC Comics female supervillains
DC Comics martial artists
DC Comics metahumans
DC Comics superheroes
DC Comics supervillains
Fictional assassins in comics
Fictional Cambodian people
Fictional characters from New York City
Fictional characters missing an eye
Fictional characters with anti-magic or power negation abilities
Fictional characters with eidetic memory
Fictional characters with precognition
Fictional characters with superhuman senses
Fictional female swordfighters
Fictional mercenaries in comics
Fictional swordfighters in comics
Superheroes who are adopted
Fictional women soldiers and warriors